The Wyoming State Museum is a state-run museum established in 1895 in Cheyenne, Wyoming. It is the official state repository for material concerning Wyoming history and cultural heritage.

Permanent exhibit themes include coal, flora and fauna, fossils, Wyoming settlement, Native American culture and history, the National Park Service in Wyoming, and other Wyoming-related issues. The museum also hosts a variety of temporary exhibits and provides traveling exhibits to cultural institutions in Wyoming and surrounding states.

References

External links
 Wyoming State Museum website

Museums in Cheyenne, Wyoming
History museums in Wyoming
Art museums and galleries in Wyoming
Natural history museums in Wyoming
Paleontology in Wyoming